The canton of Saint-Lô-1 is an administrative division of the Manche department, northwestern France. It was created at the French canton reorganisation which came into effect in March 2015. Its seat is in Saint-Lô.

It consists of the following communes:

Agneaux
Le Lorey
Marigny-le-Lozon
Le Mesnil-Amey
Le Mesnil-Eury
Montreuil-sur-Lozon
Remilly-les-Marais
Saint-Gilles
Saint-Lô (partly)
Thèreval

References

Cantons of Manche